Vagit Yusufovich Alekperov (born 1 September 1950) is a Russian–Azerbaijani businessman. He was the President of the oil company Lukoil from 1993 until 2022. Alekperov previously owned a 36.8% stake in football club Spartak Moscow. Fellow former Spartak owner Leonid Fedun is Akelperov's close associate. Alekperov also owns superyacht builder Heesen Yachts. 

As part of the international governmental responses to the Russian invasion of Ukraine, the United Kingdom, Canada and Australia have imposed sanctions against Alekperov.

Biography
Alekperov was born on September 1, 1950, in Baku, Azerbaijan SSR, one of the earliest centers of the international petroleum industry. His father, who died when Vagit was a boy, worked in the oilfields all his life and inspired Alekperov to follow in his footsteps. Alekperov's father was an Azerbaijani Muslim and his mother, Russian Orthodox. Alekperov is religious, but does not define himself as either Muslim or Orthodox.

In 1974, Alekperov graduated from the Azerbaijan Oil and Chemistry Institute.

Western Siberia 
Alekperov moved to Western Siberia in 1979 and worked at Surgutneftegaz between 1979 and 1985, earning his reputation as an industry expert. He was ascending positions and by 1985 became first deputy general director of Bashneft production company. In 1987, he became general director of the newly created production company Kogalymneftegaz.

Moscow 
In 1990, Alekperov was appointed deputy minister of the Oil and Gas Industry of the Soviet Union and became the youngest deputy energy minister in Soviet history. At that time, Alekperov promoted the establishment of vertically integrated state-owned energy companies, which would bring together the wide range of organizations in the energy sector that were, at the time, reporting to different Soviet bureaucratic institutions.

Just at this time Western oil companies began to actively look for partners in Russia. During a visit to British Petroleum facilities in the United Kingdom in 1990 Alekperov personally headed the Russian delegation at the negotiations. Rondo Fehlberg, an executive at BP, told NY Times that Alekperov took control of the agenda during that 1990 trip, sternly asking the BP executives to explain how a modern oil company should be set up.

LUKoil 
In April 1993, Langepas-Uray-Kogalymneft became the joint-stock company LUKOIL, and Alekperov became its president and chairman of the board. By 2002 Alekperov owned 10.4% of the company.

In 2000, Alekperov resigned as head of the board of directors of Lukoil, but retained his position as president of the company. In May 2008, Alekperov bought 11.13 million shares (1.3%) in Lukoil, thereby increasing his stake to 20.4% and becoming the company's largest shareholder.

LUKoil was the first Russian company to acquire an American company. In November 2000, LUKoil acquired Getty Petroleum Marketing and its 1,300 gas stations in the United States Like many other Russian oligarchs, Alekperov has also moved into banking and media. In May 2006 Alekperov was one of the two main owners of IFD Kapital Group.

In 2018, Alekperov first said in an interview that he was looking for a successor to his position, a staff reshuffle, he said, could take place at the company in 2023.

Alekperov is on the 2017 list of Russian "oligarchs" named in the CAATSA unclassified report to the U.S. Congress.

International sanctions 
In April 2022, following Russia's invasion of Ukraine, Alekperov was sanctioned by Australia and the United Kingdom. On 21 April, Lukoil issued a statement saying that Alekperov had stepped down and resigned from the board of directors after 29 years.

In May 2022, Canada also imposed sanctions on Alekperov. In October 2022, New Zealand sanctioned Alekperov.

Personal life
Alekperov is married to Larisa Victorovna Alekperova and has a son Yusuf born in 1990.

Alekperov's hobby is numismatics. The exact composition of his collection is unknown, but according to some reports, it is one of the three largest private collections in Russia. According to Forbes, Alekperov's private Museum of Numismatics has more than 700 coins on display, which is about a quarter of the entire collection. It consists mainly of gold coins, from antiquity to modern Russia, some silver coins, as well as a few platinum coins of the Russian Empire.

Philanthropy 
In 2007 Alekperov founded The Foundation "Our Future" to promote social entrepreneurship in Russia.

Alekperov has repeatedly stated publicly and has confirmed that, according to his will, his stake in Lukoil (over 20% of the company) will be transferred to a specially created charitable foundation.

In 2020 coronavirus pandemic, Lukoil has donated more than RUB 652 million in 22 Russian regions and almost $900 000 dollars in its operation countries abroad. Alekperov also donated RUB 50 million of personal finances to fight coronavirus in the Republic of Komi.

Awards and honorary titles 

Alekperov was the first Russian citizen who received the Woodrow Wilson Award. He was honored in 2005 for achievements in corporate citizenship.

On 31 August 2020, ahead of Vagit Alekperov's 70th jubilee, Azerbaijani President Ilham Aliyev  awarded him with the "Dostlug" Order for his special services rendered to the development of mutual relations between Azerbaijan and the Russian Federation.

On 4 May 2022, Alekperov received the Order "For Merit to the Fatherland" of the first degree for "great contribution to the development of the fuel and energy complex and many years of diligent work".

Vagit Alekperov is also a full member of the Russian Academy of Natural Sciences.

See also
 List of Azerbaijanis
 List of Russian billionaires

References

External links

 Biography of Vagit Alekperov 
 (WSJ) Lukoil Executive’s Death Exposes Network of Inside Deals, by Glenn R. Simpson, December 6th, 2006
 Business Russia

1950 births
Azerbaijani emigrants to Russia
Soviet engineers
Living people
Businesspeople from Baku
Russian billionaires
Russian businesspeople in the oil industry
Lukoil
Azerbaijan State Oil and Industry University alumni
20th-century Russian businesspeople
Engineers from Baku
Azerbaijani billionaires
Russian oligarchs